Lelièvre is a French surname. Notable people with the surname include:

Claude Lelièvre (born 1946), Belgian public servant
Ferdinand Lelièvre (1799–1885), French colonial agriculturalist, Senator of Algeria
Gérard Lelièvre (born 1949), French racewalker
Gilles Lelievre, French slalom canoeist
Guy Lelièvre (1952–2021), Québécois politician and lawyer
Robert Lelièvre (1942–1973), French singer, songwriter and guitarist

French-language surnames